The Oxapampa antpitta (Grallaria centralis) is a species of bird in the family Grallariidae. It is endemic to Peru. The Oxapampa antpitta was formerly believed to be a population of the chestnut antpitta, but in 2020 was described as its own species by Peter A. Hosner, Mark B. Robbins, Morton L. Isler and R. Terry Chesser.

Taxonomy 
The Oxapampa antpitta was described as a new species based on differences in plumage color, vocalizations and mitochondrial genetic evidence. The birds in the Oxapampa antpitta's range were formerly ascribed to G. blakei.

The common name reflects the Oxapampa province where specimens of the species were first collected. The specific name, centralis, reflects its range's proximity to the geographic center of Peru.

Distribution and habitat 
The Oxapampa antpitta is endemic to the eastern slope of the Peruvian Andes in the provinces of Huánaco, Pasco and Junín. They inhabit humid montane forest and frequent the understory and forest floor.

They are separated from the closely related Ayacucho antpitta by the Mantaro river.

References 

Endemic fauna of Peru
Birds of Peru
Grallaria